Revenge (Spanish: Revancha) is a 1948 Mexican crime film directed by Alberto Gout and starring Ninón Sevilla, David Silva and Agustín Lara.

The film's art direction was by José Rodríguez Granada.

Cast
   Ninón Sevilla as Rosa  
 David Silva as Rafael  
 Agustín Lara as Agustín  
 Toña la Negra as Toña  
 Pedro Vargas as Cantante 
 Lalo Malcolm as Don Alejandro  
 Manuel Dondé as Gilberto Acosta  
 Miguel Manzano as El Gillet  
 Fernando Barthell as Jimmy  
 Olga Santiago 
 José Muñoz as Don Javier 
 Cecilia Leger as Esposa de Baltazar 
 Ignacio Peón as Cliente cabaret  
 Joaquín Roche as Don Baltazar
 Ángela Rodríguez as Mujer en cabaret

References

Bibliography 
 Andrew Grant Wood. Agustin Lara: A Cultural Biography. OUP USA, 2014.

External links 
 

1948 films
1948 crime films
Mexican crime films
1940s Spanish-language films
Films directed by Alberto Gout
Mexican black-and-white films
1940s Mexican films